Aequian is an extinct Italic language presumed spoken by the people the Romans termed Aequi and Aequicoli living in the Alban hills of northeast Latium and the central Apennines east of them during the early and middle Roman Republic; that is, approximately from the 5th to the 3rd century BC, when they were defeated by the armies of Rome and were subsequently Romanized. As the area was heavily colonized by Latin speakers from Rome, most of the inscriptions from there are in Latin. Two undated inscriptions appear to be in a different dialect, termed Aequian by the scholars with the presumption that in fact they represent the language of the entire pre-Roman tribe. Not enough text survives to deduce any more than that it belonged to the Italic branch of the Indo-European language family.

Corpus
Aequian is scantily documented by two inscriptions. Conway's publication of Italic inscriptions adds a gloss, several place names and several dozen personal names, but it does not distinguish which of these are certainly endonyms and which are Latin exonyms in use by the Latin-speaking population. It is possible that they would have been the same in both cases, but such a hypothesis remains unproven.

The Inscription of Alba Fucens is a bronze plate inscribed with ALBSI PATRE. Conway reconstructs the first word as *albe(n)si, a dative case. Baldi translates the text into Latin as Albano patri, two datives, and into English as "To the (god named) Alban Father."

The second document is the Inscription of Cliternia (Capradosso) in Petrella Salto, an inscribed stone in a spring dissociated from context by nature (it rolled down a hill). The text is:
 VIA INFERIOR | PRIVATAST | T VMBRENI C F |
 PRECARIO | ITVR | PECVS PLOSTRV | NIQVIS AGAT

which is a notice stating that the road is private, passage by permission of Titus Umbrenus, son of Gaius, but beasts of burden are forbidden.

Notes

Bibliography
 

Italic languages
Languages of ancient Italy
Languages attested from the 5th century BC
Languages extinct in the 3rd century BC